Maud Hyttenberg (26 April 1920 – 8 March 2009) was a Swedish actress.

She was born in Stockholm. She appeared in several films and television series, including 1970's The Lustful Vicar. She died in March 2009.

Selected filmography
 Love Wins Out (1949)
 Crime in Paradise (1959)

References

External links

1920 births
2009 deaths
Swedish stage actresses
Swedish film actresses
Actresses from Stockholm